The 1966 Kentucky Wildcats football team were an American football team that represented the University of Kentucky as a member of the Southeastern Conference during the 1966 NCAA University Division football season. In their fifth season under head coach Charlie Bradshaw, the team compiled a 3–6–1 record (2–4 in the SEC).

Schedule

References

Kentucky
Kentucky Wildcats football seasons
Kentucky Wildcats football